Charles III (born 1948) is King of the United Kingdom and 14 other Commonwealth realms.

Charles III may also refer to:
 Charles III, Holy Roman Emperor (839–888)
 Charles III of West Francia (879–929)
 Charles III of Anjou (1290–1325)
 Charles III of Alençon (1337–1375)
 Charles III of Naples (1345–1386)
 Charles III of Navarre (1361–1425)
 Charles III, Duke of Savoy (1486–1553)
 Charles III, Duke of Bourbon (1490–1527)
 Charles III, Duke of Lorraine (1543–1608)
 Charles III, Prince of Guéméné (1655–1727)
 Charles III Philip, Elector Palatine (1661–1742)
 Charles III of Hungary (1685–1740)
 Charles III of Spain (1716–1788)
 The name Charles III of Spain was also used by Charles VI, Holy Roman Emperor (1685–1740) during the War of the Spanish Succession, 1705–1713
 Charles III John of Norway (1763–1844)
 Charles III, Prince of Monaco (1818–1889)
 Charles III, Duke of Parma (1823–1854)
 Charles III of Bohemia (1887–1922)

Other 
 Charles Edward Stuart (1720–1788), Stuart pretender who styled himself Charles III
 King Charles III (play), a 2014 play by Mike Bartlett, about the British king (released when he was Prince of Wales)
 King Charles III (film), a 2017 adaptation of the play
 Charles III (album), by organist Charles Earland

See also 
 King Charles (disambiguation)
 Order of Charles III, established by Charles III of Spain
 Carlos III (disambiguation)